David Kakuta Mulwa (born 9 April 1945) is a Kenyan writer, academic, theatre director and actor. He is currently a theatre arts lecturer in Kenyatta University's School of Visual and Performing Arts.

Biography
Born in Mukaa, Machakos County, Kenya, Mulwa attended Nairobi University. Encouraged by his professors, he attended UCLA with a Rockefeller Foundation scholarship and earned a masters degree in theatre. In 1974, Mulwa joined Kenyatta University, Nairobi,

Career 
Mulwa started his teaching career in Mukaa High School and Kangundo High School, Machakos between 1968 and 1970. He went to Ohio University where he was a teaching assistant in English before proceeding to Athens between 1979 and 1980. He then moved to Kenyatta University, where he has been for over 34 years.

Mulwa teaches theatre (History of theatre), drama, playwriting, directing and acting.

He has been an adjudicator in the Kenya Drama Festivals Committee, Nairobi, since 1978 and also serves as a member in the governing council, Kenya Cultural Centre Committee, Nairobi

Awards 
He has been awarded a Hero’s award by the Kenyatta University’s governing council and also by the Kenya Film Commission twice; in Kalasha Award for lifetime Achievement and Theatre Lifetime Achievement

Bibliography
 Bahati’s Love Nest, 2017
 Flee, Mama Flee, 2014
 We Come in Peace, Oxford University Press, 2011
 Katende Says "No", 2007
 Inheritance, Longhorn Publishers, 2004
 Crocodile’s Jaw, 2003
 Clean Hands, Oxford University Press, 2000
 Glasshouses, Oxford University Press, 2000
 Redemption, Longman House, 1990
 Master and Servant, Longman House, 1987
 Daraja, Oxford University Press, 1986
 Mkimbizi, 1988 (with A. S Yahya)
 Ukame, 1984 (with A. S Yahya)
 Buriani, 1983 (with A. S Yahya)

References

External links
 
 

1945 births
Living people
Kenyan writers
Kenyan male writers
20th-century Kenyan male actors
University of Nairobi alumni
Kenyan male film actors